Tamara Levinson (born November 17, 1976, Buenos Aires, Argentina) is a dance choreographer and retired American rhythmic gymnast.

She competed for the United States of America in the individual rhythmic gymnastics all-around competition at the 1992 Olympic Games in Barcelona. She was 40th in the qualification round and didn't advance to the final.

After spots, she began work as a dance choreographer; she appeared in Laura Welsh's "Cold Front" video.

She was one of the dancers of 2006 Madonna Confessions Tour

References

External links 
 Tamara Levinson at Sports-Reference.com

1976 births
Living people
American rhythmic gymnasts
Gymnasts at the 1992 Summer Olympics
Olympic gymnasts of the United States
Pan American Games medalists in gymnastics
Pan American Games gold medalists for the United States
Pan American Games silver medalists for the United States
Pan American Games bronze medalists for the United States
Gymnasts at the 1995 Pan American Games
Medalists at the 1995 Pan American Games
21st-century American women